Callum Jonathan Brain is a Welsh footballer who plays as a goalkeeper for Yate Town.

Career
A product of the Newport County academy, Brain made his professional debut for Newport on 10 November 2020 in the starting lineup for the 3–1 EFL Trophy defeat to Plymouth Argyle. In August 2021 Brain joined Yate Town on a free transfer.

References

External links

2003 births
Living people
Welsh footballers
Association football goalkeepers
Newport County A.F.C. players